Yahyaabad (also Romanized as Yaḩyáābād) is a village in Shamkan Rural District, Sheshtomad District, Sabzevar County, Razavi Khorasan Province, Iran. At the 2006 census, its population was 998, in 237 families.

References 

Populated places in Sabzevar County